Cytidia is a genus of fungi in the family Vuilleminiaceae. The genus contains five widely distributed species. Cytidia was circumscribed by French mycologist Lucien Quélet in 1888.

References

Corticiales
Agaricomycetes genera